Shuffling Ivories is a duo album by jazz pianist Roberto Magris and bassist Eric Hochberg recorded in Chicago, released on the JMood label in 2021.

Reception

The All About Jazz review by Dan McClenaghan awarded the album 4 stars and simply states: "You cannot get a sound that is more dead-center-of-the-U.S.A." The Los Angeles Jazz Scene review by Scott Yanow simply states: "Shuffling Ivories is a real standout and possibly Magris’ finest (or at least one of his most rewarding) recordings." The All About Jazz review by Edward Blanco awarded the album 4 stars and simply states: "An affirmation that when it comes to playing jazz, two can be enough." The Mr. Stu’s Record Room review by Stuart Kremsky simply states: "Shuffling Ivories is pretty much irresistible music-making from start to finish. Highly recommended." The Jazz World Quest review by Stephen Bocioaca simply states: "The flawless interplay between the two musicians is a definite asset to this enchanting album, which creatively mixes tradition and contemporary without losing the original spirit of these timeless classics." The Notes on Jazz review by Ralph A. Miriello simply states: "A delightful record that is easy to sit back with, listen to and enjoy. Just marvel at how much musical magic two instruments under the control of two talented players can produce."

Track listing

 Shuffling Ivories (Roberto Magris) - 4:06 
 I've Found a New Baby (Jack Palmer/Spencer Williams) - 4:49 
 Clef Club Jump (Roberto Magris) - 4:27 
 Memories of You (Eubie Blake) - 6:15 
 The Time Of This World Is At Hand (Gault) - 6:35 
 Quiet Dawn (Cal Massey) - 8:43 
 Laverne (Andrew Hill) - 7:20
 Anysha (Trudy Pitts) - 7:07 
 Italy (Roberto Magris) - 5:38 
 The Chevy Chase (Eubie Blake) - 3:10
 Laverne (Andrew Hill) - Take 2 - 9:06

Personnel

Musicians
Roberto Magris - piano
 Eric Hochberg - bass

Production
 Paul Collins – executive producer and co-producer
Vijay Tellis-Nayak – engineering
Abe Goldstien – design
 Paul Collins – photography

References

2021 albums
Roberto Magris albums